Dietlinde Turban (born 27 August 1957 in Reutlingen in Germany) is the birth name and stage name of Dietlinde Turban Maazel, a German actress. Her brother is the violinist Ingolf Turban.

Dietlinde Turban's first stage appearance at the age of 19 as Gretchen in Goethe's Faust at the Residenz-Theatre in Munich brought her national fame. In rapid succession she starred in new productions of Lessing's Minna von Barnhelm (as Minna), Shakespeare's Othello (as Desdemona – for which she received the Bad Hersfeld Festival prize for best actress), and in works of Anouilh, Giraudoux and others. She was invited as guest star at the State Theater in Bonn and the Josefstadt Theatre in Vienna.

Thanks to scores of films and plays filmed for television, Turban won Germany's coveted Bambi Award by popular vote as Best Actress of the Year (1983).

In 2004 Turban performed her first One Woman Play Constantly Risking Absurdity which she premiered in Castleton and at the Cherry Lane Theatre, New York. She performed it a year later at the George Mason University and was also invited with this play to Salzburg, Austria, by the American Austrian Foundation, for the inauguration of Schloss Arenberg in 2005. In the summer 2013 she performed Jean Cocteau's La Voix Humaine at the Castleton Festival.

Turban Maazel appeared as soloist/narrator with the New York Philharmonic, the Pittsburgh Symphony, the National Symphony Orchestra and the Symphony Orchestra of the Bavarian Radio, Munich. Turban Maazel has recorded a number of audio books (Naxos) as well as CDs in collaboration with young composers. She also performs dramatic readings of literary masterpieces both in the United States and in Europe and tours with recitals based on works by Andersen, Fontane, Heine, Kafka, Rilke, Schiller, Thomas Mann ("Das Teufelsgespräch" from Doktor Faustus), and a portrayal of Lou Andreas Salomé.

Turban Maazel studied violin, classical dance and voice in Munich (Musikhochschule), New York and Aspen. Her theatre studies include Master Classes with Peter Brook, Lee Strasberg and the T. Schreiber Studio, New York City.

In 1986 she married the conductor Lorin Maazel. They have two sons and a daughter.

In 1996 she founded a private school for low-income families on her Virginia Estate and developed a pilot educational project designed to explore new ways of integrating vital artistic and aesthetic values into school curricula, inspired by Rudolf Steiner.

In 2009 Turban Maazel co-founded the Castleton Festival with her husband, Maestro Lorin Maazel. After his passing in 2014 she took over as Artistic Director and CEO. In addition to overseeing a year-round performance season at the Castleton Theatre (CiP) she works as a private performance coach in Manhattan and teaches every summer at the "Castleton Artists Training Seminar" (CATS), the Castleton Festival's Young Artist Program.

She married Antony Wood on 1 July 2018.

Turban Maazel lives in New York City where she works as a stage director and private acting coach. She created the course "Acting for Singers" for Rutgers University where she is on faculty. She regularly holds masterclasses and is a guest faculty member of the International Vocal Arts Institute and Highland Opera Studios in the U.S. and Canada.

Selected filmography

Television
Derrick – Season 5, Episode 3: "Abendfrieden" (1978), as Annabelle Schönerer
Derrick – Season 5, Episode 13: "Abitur" (1978), as Lisa Klose
Ihr 106. Geburtstag (1979), as Fifine
 (1979), as Julia Zeitler
Der Thronfolger (1980), as Doris Ritter
 (1980), as Sonja Schmitt
Kabale und Liebe (1980, based on Intrigue and Love), as Luise Miller
Überfall in Glasgow (1981), as Liz Sandon
Klein Zaches genannt Zinnober (1982, based on ), as Candida
Stella (1982, based on ), as Stella
Bretter, die die Welt bedeuten (TV series, 1982), as Susanne
Derrick – Season 9, Episode 6: "Das Alibi" (1982), as Martina Busse
 (TV miniseries, 1982), as Aloysia Weber
Frau Jenny Treibel (1982, based on Frau Jenny Treibel), as Corinna Schmidt
Nachruf auf Othello (1983), as Catherine Wood
Mussolini and I (TV miniseries, 1985), as Felizitas Beetz
Derrick: "Die Tänzerin" (1985), as Katrin May
Mord am Pool (1986), as Anna Truman
Fatal Love (1986), as Sarah Erdmann
 (TV series, 1986), as Clarissa
L'ingénieur aimait trop les chiffres (1989), as Linda Sorbier

Film
Bloodline (1979)
The Salt Prince (1983), as Princess Barbora
 (1988), as Fürstin Ursela

References

External links

Official Website – Dietlinde Turban Maazel

German television actresses
1957 births
Living people
German stage actresses
German film actresses
People from Reutlingen
20th-century German actresses
21st-century German actresses
German expatriates in the United States